Croton lawianus is a species of the family Euphorbiaceae native to the Nilgiri Hills of Tamil Nadu, India.

It is related to:
 Trigonostemon lawianus (Nimmo ex Dalzell & A.Gibson) Müll.Arg.

References

External links 
 

lawianus
Flora of Tamil Nadu
Plants described in 1839
Taxa named by Nicol Alexander Dalzell